The 1998 Indian general election were held to elect 20 members to the twelfth Lok Sabha from Kerala. Indian National Congress (INC)-led United Democratic Front (UDF) won 11 seats, while the Left Democratic Front (LDF), led by Communist Party of India (Marxist) (CPI(M)) won the remaining 9 seats. The earlier election in 1996 saw both alliances win equal share of seats. Turnout for the election was at 70.66%

Background 
The ruling LDF government in the state faced infightings, especially among V. S. Achuthanandan and CITU as the former was denied the Chief Ministerial post. KSKTU launched agitations against paddy field reclamation, which spiraled into a law and order issue. The state High Court directed the government to return the crop fields to the farmers. M. L. Ahuja cited "an element of militancy" and "disregard for democratic forms of agitations" among the CPI(M) activists during the agitation.

Alliances and parties 

UDF is a Kerala legislative alliance formed by INC veteran K. Karunakaran. LDF comprises primarily of CPI(M) and the CPI, forming the Left Front in the national level. Bharatiya Janata Party (BJP), leading National Democratic Alliance (NDA) at national level contested in all 20 seats.

United Democratic Front

Left Democratic Front

National Democratic Alliance

List of elected MPs

Results

Performance of political parties

By constituency

See also 
 Elections in Kerala
 Politics of Kerala

References 

1998 elections in India
Elections in Kerala